The following are the national records in Olympic weightlifting in Bulgaria. Records are maintained in each weight class for the snatch lift, clean and jerk lift, and the total for both lifts by the Bulgarian Weightlifting Federation.

Current records

Men

Women

Historical records

Men (1998–2018)

Women (1998–2018)

 Ivanov failed the competition doping test and the IOC & IWF canceled the results, the BWF however still lists them as records.
 Before 2005, the scores in the snatch and the clean and jerk were rounded down to the nearest 2.5 kg. Thus, Boevski's total was recorded as 357.5 kg.

References

External links

Bulgaria
records
Olympic weightlifting
weightlifting